Tibor Ribényi (25 February 1914 – 9 May 1981) was a Hungarian sprinter. He competed in the men's 400 metres at the 1936 Summer Olympics.

References

1914 births
1981 deaths
Athletes (track and field) at the 1936 Summer Olympics
Hungarian male sprinters
Olympic athletes of Hungary
Place of birth missing